Kada River is a 2017 Nigerian romantic drama film directed by Toka McBaror who also co-produced it alongside Forinclay Ejeh and executive produced by Olakunle Churchill. The film stars Nollywood actors and actress such as Joke Silva, Keppy Ekpenyong, Rachel Oniga and Bayray McNwizu. Others including an ex-housemate in Big Brother Naija 2017 - TBoss (Tokunbo Badmus), Ghanaian actress - Fella Makafui, Chris Okagbue, James Blessing, Rakiya Attah and Oluchi Madubuko. The film is an epic portraying the crises rocking Kaduna State, with the title being another name for the Kaduna River.

Production
The film was shot around Kafanchan and Kagoro, the locations where the true life events happened on February 21, 2000 as narrated from the director's perspective. Its production was sponsored by the Big Church Foundation.

Plot
The film portrays the ancient rivalry between the Boduas and the Shawlains, which graduated into a tensed and bloody unrest, in the midst of which two young lovers, Jerome (Chris Okagbue) and Nadia (Fella Makafui), struggle to help change the intense hate nurtured between their ethnic groups.

Cast
 Chris Okagbue as Jerome
 Fella Makafui as Nadia
 Joke Silva as Grandma Nadia
 Keppy Ekpenyong
 Rachel Oniga as Mrs. Ekon
 Bayray McNwizu
 TBoss
 James Blessing
 Rakiya Attah
 Oluchi Madubuko

Release
The film premiered alongside nine other films at the Nollywood Travel Film Festival, held at the University of Toronto auditorium, Toronto, Canada. It was the opening film at the maiden edition of the event held at Imagine Cinemas and the National Event Center in Toronto between September 12–16, 2017.

References

External links
 
 Kada River (2017) on Nollywood Boulevard

2017 films
English-language Nigerian films
Nigerian romantic drama films
2010s English-language films